Hendecaneura rhododendrophaga is a species of moth of the family Tortricidae. It is found in China (Sichuan) and Japan.

The larvae feed on Rhododendron species.

References

Moths described in 1997
Eucosmini